The Battle of Kaçanik Pass (Albanian: Beteja e Grykës së Kaçanikut) was a battle between Albanian rebels and Ottoman forces during the Revolt of 1910. The clashes represented a series of military offensives launched by Shevket Turgut Pasha against Albanian rebels that blocked the railway to Skopje at the Kaçanik Pass.

Background 
In 1910 the Young Turk Ottoman government imposed new centralization policies in Albania, which resulted in the Albanian revolt of 1910. The Rebels were supported by the Kingdom of Serbia. New taxes levied in the early months of 1910 led to Isa Boletini's activity to convince Albanian leaders who had already been involved in a 1909 uprising to try another revolt against the Ottoman Empire. The Albanian attacks on the Ottomans in Priştine (now Pristina) and Ferizovik (now Ferizaj), the killing of the Ottoman commander in İpek (now Peja), and the insurgents' blocking of the railway to Skopje at the Kaçanik Pass led to the Ottoman government's declaration of martial law in the area.

Battle 
By the end of April 1910, Albanian rebels under Idriz Seferi numbering 3,000 blocked the railway to Skopje at the Kaçanik Pass. They captured a train conveying soldiers and military supplies to the Ottoman garrison of Pristina, disarmed the soldiers and held the supplies. Following this, Tergut Pasha attacked the Kaçanik Pass with 16,000 men. After 13 hours of heavy fighting the Ottomans were defeated by the Albanians led by Idriz Seferi. Tergut Pasha then planned another attack and increased the size of his army to 40,000 men. After two days of fierce fighting, the Ottoman forces captured the Kaçanik Pass. Idriz Seferi's forces then withdrew to defensive positions in the village of Komogllava near Kaçanik, where the Ottomans attacked the Albanian rebels and again suffered heavy casualties, Idriz Seferi himself slew 12 Turkish Soldiers during the fighting in Komogllava, but again Albanian forces were defeated and forced to withdraw due to superior numbers of the Ottoman forces. Idriz Seferi then withdrew with his remaining soldiers to the Karadak region, where he continued his resistance.

Aftermath 
Despite losing the Battle, the Albanians managed to inflict heavy losses to the Ottoman army and continued their resistance in Karadak. In All The Ottomans lost over 2,000 men in Karadak. After the Battle Tergut Pasha continued his campaign and attacked the Albanian forces led by Isa Boletini and Hasan Budakova, which meanwhile were blocking the Ferizovik-Prizren road to Carraleva Pass. Superior in numbers, the Ottoman forces tried at first a frontal attack but the stiff resistance offered made them change their tactics. They made a pincer movement, trying to encircle the Albanian forces in Carralevo pass.

After three days of fighting the Albanian forces withdrew to the Drenica region. Ottoman forces entered Prizren in the middle of May 1910. They proceeded to Yakova and İpek where they entered on June 1, 1910. By government orders part of the force proceeded in the direction of Scutari (now Shkodër), while another column marched toward the Debre region (now known as Dibër in Albania, and Debar in the Republic of North Macedonia). The first column marching to Scutari managed to capture the Morinë pass, after fighting with the Albanian tribal forces of the Gashi, Krasniqi and Bytyqi areas, led by Zeqir Halili, Abdulla Hoxha, and Shaban Binaku. Ottoman forces were stopped for more than 20 days in the Agri Pass, from the Albanian forces of Shalë, Shoshë, Nikaj and Mërtur areas, led by Prel Tuli, Mehmet Shpendi, and Marash Delia. Unable to repress their resistance, this column took another way to Scutari, passing from the Pukë region. On July 24, 1910, Ottoman forces entered the city of Scutari (now known as Shkodër). During this period martial courts were put in action and summary executions took place. A large number of firearms were collected and many villages and properties were burned by the Ottoman army.

See also 

 Battle of Carraleva Pass
 Albanian revolt of 1912
 Malësor tribes revolt of 1917

References

Sources 

 
 
 
 
 
 
 
 
 

Military history of Albania
1910 in Albania
1910 in the Ottoman Empire
Kaçanik Pass
Albanian Question